Cychrus yulongxuicus is a species of ground beetle in the subfamily of Carabinae that is endemic to the Sichuan province of China. It was described by Deuve in 1990.

References

yulongxuicus
Beetles described in 1990
Endemic fauna of Sichuan
Beetles of Asia